Muğla Province is a province of Turkey, at the country's south-western corner, on the Aegean Sea.

Etymology
The original name of Muğla is open to debate. Various sources refer to the city as Mogola, Mobella or Mobolia.

Geography
At , Muğla's coastline is the longest among the Provinces of Turkey and longer than many countries' coastlines, (even without taking any small islands into account). Important is the Datça Peninsula. As well as the sea, Muğla has two large lakes, Lake Bafa in the district of Milas and Lake Köyceğiz. The landscape consists of pot-shaped small plains surrounded by mountains, formed by depressions in the Neogene. These include the plain of the city of Muğla itself, Yeşilyurt, Ula, Gülağzı, Yerkesik, Akkaya,  and Yenice). Until the recent building of highways, transport from these plains to either the coast or inland was quite arduous, and thus each locality remained an isolated culture of its own. Contact with the outside world was through one of the three difficult passes: northwest to Milas, north to the Menderes plain through Gökbel, or northeast to Tavas.

The economy of Muğla relies mainly on tourism (on the coast), and agriculture, forestry and marble quarries inland. 

Agriculture in Muğla is rich and varied; the province is one of Turkey's largest producers of honey, pine-forest honey in particular and citrus fruits are grown in Ortaca, Fethiye, Dalaman and Dalyan.

The province is the second center of marble industry in Turkey after Afyonkarahisar in terms of quantity, variety and quality. Other mineral exploitation includes coal-mining in Yatağan and chrome in Fethiye.  Other industry in the province includes the SEKA paper mill in Dalaman, However Muğla is by no means an industrialised province.

Environment
Despite court decisions upheld by the ECHR, Yatağan, Yeniköy and Kemerköy coal-fired power stations continue to pollute.

Transportation
The following are aspects about transportation in Muğla province:

 There are two airports in Dalaman and Milas-Bodrum, serving domestic and international flights and catering to the tourism industry.
 There are yacht marinas in Bodrum, Marmaris, Fethiye and Güllük.
 There are many privately run bus connections to İzmir, Antalya, Ankara, Istanbul and other major cities in Turkey from Muğla and directly from the coastal resorts.

History
In ancient times in Anatolia, the region between the  Menderes (Meander) and Dalaman (Indus) rivers in the south was called Caria. The inhabitants were Carians and Leleges. In his Iliad, Homer describes the Carians as natives of Anatolia, defending their country against Greeks in joint campaigns in collaboration with the Trojans.

A major city of ancient Caria, Muğla is known to have been occupied by raiding parties of Egyptians, Assyrians and Scythians, until eventually the area was settled by Ancient Greek colonists. The Greeks inhabited this coast for a long time building prominent cities, such as Knidos (at the end of the Datça Peninsula) and Bodrum (Halicarnassos), as well as  many smaller towns along the coast, on the Bodrum Peninsula and inland, including in the district of Fethiye the cities of Telmessos, Xanthos, Patara and Tlos. Eventually the coast was conquered by Persians who were in turn removed by Alexander the Great, bringing an end to the satrapy of Caria.

In 1261, Menteshe Bey, founder of the Beylik (principality) that carried his name, with its capital in Milas and nearby Beçin, established his rule over the region of Muğla as well. The beys of Menteshe held the city until 1390 and this, the first Turkish state in the region, achieved a high level of cultural development, its buildings remaining to this day. The province also became a significant naval power, trading with the Aegean Islands, Crete and as far as Venice and Egypt. Turkish settlement during the Menteshe period usually took place through migrations along the Kütahya-Tavas axis.

In 1390, Muğla was taken over by the Ottoman Empire. However, just twelve years later, Tamerlane and his forces defeated the Ottomans in the Battle of Ankara, and returned control of the region to its former rulers, the Menteshe Beys, as he did for other Anatolian beyliks. Muğla was brought back under Ottoman control by Sultan Mehmed II the Conqueror, in 1451. One of the most important events in the area during the Ottoman period was the well-recorded campaign of Suleiman the Magnificent against Rhodes, which was launched from Marmaris.

Archaeology 

With this long history Muğla is rich in ancient ruins, with over 100 excavated sites including the UNESCO World Heritage Site of Letoon, near Fethiye.

In 2018, archaeologists unearthed a 2,300-year-old rock sepulchre of an ancient Greek boxer called Diagoras of Rhodes on a hill in the Turgut village, Muğla province, Marmaris. This unusual pyramid tomb was considered to belong to a holy person by the local people. The shrine, used as a pilgrimage by locals until the 1970s, also has the potential to be the only pyramid grave in Turkey. Excavation team also discovered an inscription with these words: “I will be vigilant at the very top so as to ensure that no coward can come and destroy this grave".

In July 2021, archaeologists led by Abuzer Kızıl have announced the discovery of two 2,500-year-old marble statues and an inscription during excavations at the Temple of Zeus Lepsynos in Euromus. According to Abuzer Kızıl, one of the statues was naked while other was wearing armor made of leather and a short skirt. Both of the statues were depicted with a lion in their hands.

Gallery

Notable people
The following are notable residents of Muğla province:
 Herodotus of Halicarnassos, historian 
 Turgut Reis, seaman
 Basil Zaharoff, arms dealer born in Muğla
 Osman Hamdi Bey, painter, had his summer residence in Yatağan
 Şükrü Kaya, Minister of the Interior under Atatürk, born in İstanköy
 Mustafa Muğlalı, Turkish War of Independence general 
 Yunus Nadi Abalıoğlu, founder of Cumhuriyet newspaper and key supporter of Atatürk, from Fethiye
 Zihni Derin, agriculturalist responsible for planting tea in the Eastern Black Sea region, from Muğla
 Necati Çiller, father of Prime Minister Tansu Çiller, governor of Istanbul in the 1950s, from Milas
 Cevat Şakir Kabaağaçlı, writer of The "Fisherman of Halicarnasoss" and his student Şadan Gökovalı
 Nail Çakırhan, architect of the Akyaka Çakırhan houses and winner of the Aga Khan Award for Architecture 
 Janet Akyüz Mattei amateur astronomer and president of the American Association of Variable Star Observers (AAVSO), of Bodrum.
 Zeki Müren, singer and fixture of the Bodrum nightclub scene for many years
 Poet Can Yücel is buried in Datça, his home in his final years
 Former president Kenan Evren lived in Marmaris after he retired until his death.

Districts

Politics 

The Republican People's Party (CHP), Turkey's principal center-left party has a traditionally strong presence across the political landscape of Muğla Province, closely followed by the traditional center-right represented by the Democrat Party (DP) in Turkey's politics, although the incumbent Justice and Development Party (AKP) obtained the first place in the ballots cast during the last national-scale elections that were the 2004 local elections, with 31,25% of the votes. The overall percentage for the province was 26,3% for the CHP, and 20,98% for the DP during the same elections. The rightist Nationalist Movement Party (MHP),  campaigning on Turkish nationalism had obtained a further 9,5% (especially in the Fethiye district). The other parties registered less significant percentages.

References

External links

 Muğla governor's official website 
 Muğla municipality's official website 
 Local information 
 Muğla Otelleri
 Pictures of the capital of Muğla province
 Muğla weather forecast information
 Datça Panoramic City Guide